Goeldichironomus is a genus of midges in the family Chironomidae. There are about 14 described species in Goeldichironomus.

Species
These 14 species belong to the genus Goeldichironomus:

 Goeldichironomus adhaerens
 Goeldichironomus amazonicus (Fittkau, 1965)
 Goeldichironomus carus (Townes, 1945)
 Goeldichironomus devineyae (Beck, 1961)
 Goeldichironomus fluctuans Reiss, 1974
 Goeldichironomus holoprasinus (Goeldi, 1905)
 Goeldichironomus luridus Trivinho-Strixino & Strixino, 2005
 Goeldichironomus maculatus Strixino & Strixino, 1991
 Goeldichironomus natans Reiss, 1974
 Goeldichironomus neopictus Trivinho-Strixino & Strixino, 1998
 Goeldichironomus petiolicola Trivinho-Strixino & Strixino, 2005
 Goeldichironomus pictus Reiss, 1974
 Goeldichironomus serratus Reiss, 1974
 Goeldichironomus xiborena Reiss, 1974

References

Further reading

External links

 

Chironomidae
Articles created by Qbugbot